Dr. Juan Sanchez Acevedo Coliseum is an arena in Moca, Puerto Rico.  It hosted the weightlifting events for the 2010 Central American and Caribbean Games.

References

2010 Central American and Caribbean Games venues